Institute of Regional Studies, Islamabad, is an independent, non-profit research centre devoted to the study of the region around Pakistan: South Asia, Southwest Asia (Iran, Afghanistan and the Persian Gulf), China, Central Asia as well as the Indian Ocean region. It also studies and analyses policies of major power centers towards South Asia. The Institute was set up in March 1982. It is considered one of Pakistan's leading think tanks.

External links
 Official website

Think tanks based in Pakistan
Organisations based in Islamabad
Pakistan federal departments and agencies
1982 establishments in Pakistan